The canton of Audruicq is a former canton situated in the department of the Pas-de-Calais and in the Nord-Pas-de-Calais region of northern France. It was disbanded following the French canton reorganisation which came into effect in March 2015. It consisted of 13 communes, which joined the canton of Marck in 2015. It had a total of 25,255 inhabitants (2012, without double counting).

Geography 
The canton is organised around Audruicq in the arrondissement of Saint-Omer. The altitude varies from 0m (Oye-Plage) to 64m (Ruminghem) for an average altitude of 6m.

The canton comprised 13 communes:

Audruicq
Guemps
Nortkerque
Nouvelle-Église
Offekerque
Oye-Plage
Polincove
Ruminghem
Saint-Folquin
Sainte-Marie-Kerque
Saint-Omer-Capelle
Vieille-Église
Zutkerque

Population

See also 
Cantons of Pas-de-Calais 
Communes of Pas-de-Calais 
Arrondissements of the Pas-de-Calais department

References

Audruicq
2015 disestablishments in France
States and territories disestablished in 2015